Pluguffan is a commune in the Finistère department of Brittany in north-western France.

Population
Inhabitants of Pluguffan are called in French Pluguffanais.

See also
 Quimper - Cornouaille Airport
 Communes of the Finistère department
 Krampouz

References

External links

Official website

Mayors of Finistère Association 

Communes of Finistère